is a former Japanese football player.

Playing career
Makino was born in Fukuoka Prefecture on May 29, 1976. After graduating from high school, he joined Yokohama Marinos in 1995. Although the club won the champions J1 League, he could not play at all in the match and left the club end of 1995 season. In 1998, he joined Japan Football League club Sagan Tosu. The club was promoted to J2 League in 1999. He played 12 matches as midfielder in 2 seasons. He retired end of 1999 season.

Beach soccer career
In 2005, Makino was selected Japan national beach soccer team for 2005 Beach Soccer World Cup. Japan team won the 4th place. He played at Beach Soccer World Cup 7 times; 2005, 2006, 2008, 2009, 2011, 2013 and 2015.

Club statistics

References

External links

1976 births
Living people
Association football people from Fukuoka Prefecture
Japanese footballers
J1 League players
J2 League players
Japanese beach soccer players
Japan Football League (1992–1998) players
Yokohama F. Marinos players
Sagan Tosu players
Association football midfielders